Levshin is a Russian surname. It may refer to:

 Alina Levshin (born 1984), German actress
 Platon Levshin (1737–1812), Russian theologian
 Victor Levchin, Soviet rower who competed at the 1970 World Rowing Championships
 Vladimir Levshin (born 1983), Russian football player

Russian-language surnames